Mann Lake is the largest of the shallow playa lakes in the northern part of the Alvord Valley in Harney County in the U.S. state of Oregon. The lake is a remnant of a larger Pleistocene lake that covered much of the valley, east of Steens Mountain. Fields–Denio Road runs along the east side of the lake.

Inflow to Mann Lake comes from small, intermittent streams, mainly from Steens Mountain. The lake, which has no outlet, but loses water by evaporation, is hypereutrophic. An influx of cattle waste from nearby rangelands adds to the lake's natural eutrophic state. Large concentrations of Cladophora algae are common.

The site has vault restrooms and boat ramps, but no other amenities. Recreation at or near the site includes fishing, camping, hiking, wildlife viewing, and  amateur geology.

Mann Lake, stocked with Lahontan cutthroat trout, has been called "one of the premiere trout fisheries in southeast Oregon". Fishing is restricted to artificial flies and lures.

A large population of goldfish, introduced illegally, have at times multiplied in Mann Lake and competed for food with the smaller trout. In 2010, the Oregon Department of Fish and Wildlife treated the lake with rotenone, a piscicide, killing around 200,000 goldfish and fathead minnows while sparing nearly all the trout.

See also
 List of lakes in Oregon

References

External links
 Mann Lake Campground – Public Lands Information Center

Lakes of Oregon
Lakes of Harney County, Oregon
Endorheic lakes of Oregon